Mantis is a character appearing in American comic books published by Marvel Comics. Created by writer Steve Englehart and artist Don Heck, the character first appeared in The Avengers #112 (June 1973). Mantis has been depicted as a member of the Avengers and the Guardians of the Galaxy, as the bride of Kang the Conqueror, and as the mother of Sequoia.

Pom Klementieff portrays the character in the Marvel Cinematic Universe films Guardians of the Galaxy Vol. 2 (2017),  Avengers: Infinity War (2018), Avengers: Endgame (2019), Thor: Love and Thunder (2022), The Guardians of the Galaxy Holiday Special (2022), and Guardians of the Galaxy Vol. 3 (2023).

Publication history
Mantis first appeared in The Avengers #112 (June 1973), drawn by Don Heck and created by writer Steve Englehart, beginning the "Celestial Madonna" saga. After leaving Marvel Comics, Englehart carried Mantis's tale through three other companies before returning to Marvel, moving from Marvel to DC to Eclipse to Image and finally back to Marvel again.

In DC Comics' Justice League of America #142, she appears as Willow. Asked where she came from, Willow replies, "This one has come from a place she must not name, to reach a place no man must know." (Mantis refers to herself in the third person as "this one") By the end of the issue, she leaves to go give birth.

In the Eclipse Comics series Scorpio Rose #2 (according to Englehart's website ), the character calls herself Lorelei. By this time, she has given birth to a son. What would have been issue #3, a "lost" Lorelei/Scorpio Rose story was later published in Coyote Collection #1 from Image Comics, the character's fourth company. Lorelei is later mentioned in Englehart's 2010 novel The Long Man (page 355, mass market paperback edition).

Fictional character biography
Mantis is the half-Vietnamese, half-German daughter of Gustav Brandt—Libra—and was born in Huế, Vietnam. In her childhood, her father leaves her in Vietnam at the Temple of the alien Priests of Pama, a sect of the Kree. The Kree believe she might become the Celestial Madonna and mate with the eldest Cotati on Earth to become the mother of the Celestial Messiah Sequoia, "the most important being in the universe".

She excels in her martial arts studies, but when she reaches adulthood, she is mind-wiped and sent into the world to gain life experience. She becomes a sex worker and barmaid in a Vietnamese bar, where she meets the Swordsman. She helps him regain his self-respect and follows him when the former villain attempts to rejoin the Avengers. She becomes an Avengers ally when the Swordsman rejoins the Avengers, and she battles the Lion God alongside them.

With the Avengers, Mantis has many adventures. She battles the original Zodiac, and learns that Libra is her father and that she was raised by the Priests of Pama. She encounters the Star-Stalker, battles Thanos, Klaw and Solarr, Nuklo, and then alongside the Avengers, Fantastic Four, and Inhumans, she faces Ultron at the wedding of Quicksilver and Crystal.

Mantis becomes taken with the Vision, and—although rejected by the android—neglects the Swordsman. Alongside the Scarlet Witch and Agatha Harkness, she was abducted by Kang. She was revealed as the Celestial Madonna and witnessed the death of the Swordsman at the hands of Kang, only realizing the depth of her love for the Swordsman just as he dies. She then buried the Swordsman, and battled the Titanic Three. She would learn the origins of the Kree-Skrull War, the Cotati, and the Priests of Pama. Mantis then formally joins the Avengers and is revealed to be, indeed, the Celestial Madonna and marries a Cotati in the reanimated body of the Swordsman, leaving the Avengers and the Earth to mate with him.

After she bears her child Sequoia, she takes the name "Mandy Celestine" and lives with him for a year in Willimantic, Connecticut before handing him to his father's people and going into space with the Silver Surfer and battling the Elders of the Universe alongside the Surfer. The Silver Surfer finds himself falling in love with Mantis. However, Mantis (whose body was now green and had begun to manifest new powers of invulnerability that allowed her to survive in space due to side-effects of her pregnancy) grows bitter with her life and the way she was forced to abandon her child. This comes to a head when Mantis is caught in an explosion and presumed dead by Silver Surfer. She survives, but the strain of the previous years causes her to literally split into multiple versions of herself, each representing conflicting aspects of her psyche that could no longer co-exist inside her mind.

The fragments arrive on Earth and one version of Mantis rejoins the West Coast Avengers team, with portions of her memories missing. (Steve Englehart intended the storyline involving Mantis and her amnesia to be his next major plotline, but editorial problems caused him to quit the series, with the plotline resolved hastily.) Mantis discovers, through the temporarily resurrected corpse of the Swordsman, that her psyche had shattered and that she needs to find her counterparts in order to restore her memories. She made her way to New York City where she encountered the Fantastic Four as they dealt with the effects of the Inferno storyline. Kang pursued Mantis, not realizing she had lost her power and hoping to use her to attack the Dreaming Celestial, and in the process the Surfer was summoned to Earth. With the aid of the Cotati, Kang was defeated but Mantis realized she must leave her body and join with the Cotati to raise her son.

Aside from mentions by Silver Surfer, Mantis does not reappear until 1995's controversial Avengers crossover story "The Crossing". In "The Crossing", Mantis returns as the villainous bride of Kang the Conqueror with the intention of bringing death to the Avengers; her father Libra (who by now was going by the name "Moonraker" as part of Force Works); and the Cotati alien who had possessed the Swordsman's body and married/impregnated her. Her anger at her father (whom she had vivisected) and the Cotati center around their "defilement" of her and that she hates the Avengers for believing their manipulative lies.

The storyline was controversial, so much so that Kurt Busiek, in Avengers Forever limited series, retconned the Mantis who appeared in the story as being a Space Phantom brainwashed into thinking he was Mantis.

Eventually, Mantis reappears in the Steve Englehart written Avengers: Celestial Quest limited series. She returns to Earth and merges with her remaining fragmented portions of her personality (which we learn represent "freak, mother, prostitute, mystic, and Avenger") after the first four are killed by Thanos (later retroactively declared to be a clone of the real Thanos). The final Mantis merges with them to become a "complete" Mantis for the first time since her dispersion. Thus reformed, she and a group of the Avengers go into space to stop "Thanos" from killing her son, Quoi, who by this time is a rebellious teenager desperate to leave the isolation of the Cotati home-world and travel the stars. During the adventure, Mantis flirts with Vision (with the implication that she has sex with him), but ultimately ends the flirting when she realizes that he has feelings for his estranged wife Scarlet Witch, who is jealous of Mantis and Vision's friendship. Mantis also appears in the "Avengers Disassembled" storyline, although many occurrences in that storyline are illusions.

Mantis appears in the 2007 miniseries Annihilation: Conquest: Star-Lord, where she is shown as a Kree prisoner who volunteers for a mission led by Peter Quill, a.k.a. Star-Lord.

After the defeat of Ultron and the Phalanx, Mantis takes up residence on the Knowhere station with the rest of the Guardians of the Galaxy. She has assumed the role of counselor for the group, using her knowledge of the mind to maintain a balance with all the very eclectic personalities of the group.

During the Secret Invasion storyline, it was discovered that Star-Lord had Mantis use her mental powers to manipulate the members of the Guardians of the Galaxy to join the team against their will. Overhearing Mantis and Star-Lord converse about their deception, Drax shared this knowledge with the rest of the team. This caused most of the members to leave. Mantis was promoted to field status by Rocket Raccoon.

Mantis was apparently killed by the Magus, who, upon anticipating that Mantis would use her mental powers to incapacitate him, struck her and her fellow psionic Cosmo dead with a powerful blast of energy. However, it was revealed that she, along with fellow Guardians Phyla-Vell, Cosmo, Gamora and Major Victory are still alive, but being held prisoner in suspended animation by the Magus. She reunites with the other team of Guardians, telling Moondragon that Phyla-Vell was the first one killed by Thanos' rampage.

Mantis later rescues Peter Quill from a group of pursuing Spartax soldiers. Though she refuses to join his new incarnation of the Guardians, she helps him track down the source of mysterious "time quakes" that have been plaguing him in the wake of the Age of Ultron storyline.

During the "Empyre" storyline, Mantis returns to Earth upon being contacted by Black Panther about the Cotati invasion and plans to reason with her son.

Characterization

Powers and abilities
Mantis has attained a mastery of meditational disciplines, giving her an unusual amount of control over her body, including autonomic functions like heartbeat, bleeding, and breathing, as well as awareness of pain, allowing her to more quickly heal injuries through sheer force of will and affording almost superhuman reflexes and reactions. She also had psychic empathy, a telepathic power that allowed her to sense the emotions of others.

Mantis gained additional abilities as a result of communion with the Prime Cotati. Her empathic ability enabled her to communicate with the plant-like Cotati and with plant life. She has the power of astral projection. To travel in space, Mantis had the ability to separate her physical and astral forms, projecting her consciousness from her body, allowing her to travel interplanetary distances. She also had the ability to transfer her astral form to any place where plant life exists. She could form and inhabit a plant like simulacrum of her human body for herself out of the destination planet's local vegetation. Her fighting skills remained intact, and her empathic abilities were heightened to a superhuman degree and extended to the planet's flora and biosphere. She could control the vegetation within her vicinity.

During her confrontations with a powerful Thanos clone, she displayed superhuman strength, a talent to simultaneously inhabit multiple simulacra, and the ability to project strong blasts of energy, but has not been seen using these powers since.

As of her appearance in Annihilation Conquest: Star-Lord, Mantis also appears to have gained telepathic and precognitive abilities, and apparently now labors under a constant awareness of future events. During the series, Mantis displayed pyrokinesis. She can remain invisible to the Phalanx and extend her power to cloak others.

Additionally, Mantis was trained by the Priests of Pama to become a grandmistress of the martial arts, demonstrated as capable of defeating opponents as skilled as Captain America (although he was distracted while fighting a dragon). She could also instinctively sense weak points in an opponent and with her skills in pressure points, knock out beings as powerful as the thunder god, Thor.

Personality
In her first appearances, Mantis represents the "Dragon Lady" archetype, that of a mysterious Eastern seductress whose sexuality causes tension among the male Avengers. She is assertive and confident in her powers, and while she appeared somewhat arrogant at first (as illustrated by her breakup with Swordsman when she chose Vision over him), she renounced her pride after Swordsman's tragic death. Mantis is highly intelligent, with her deductive skills rivaling those of Vision's; in Vision's own words, she has a "remarkable mind".

She almost always refers to herself in the third person as "this one", "she", and occasionally "Mantis", which has to do with her upbringing at the Temple of the Priests of Pama (her husband the Cotati Elder, who spent a significant part of his life at the Temple, also referred to himself as "this one" instead of "I"). This speech mannerism is of importance for her, for when the Silver Surfer asked her to stop speaking in the third person, she refused to comply.

Costumes
She wears a green-and-yellow dress, a hairstyle which mimics insectile antennae, and goes barefoot.

Reception

Accolades 

 In 2011, Comics Buyer's Guide ranked Mantis 99th in their 100 Sexiest Women in Comics" list.
 In 2015, Entertainment Weekly ranked Mantis 43rd in their "Let's rank every Avenger ever" list.
 In 2019, CBR.com ranked Mantis 10th in their "10 Most Powerful Telepaths In The Marvel Universe" list. 
 In 2019, Sideshow ranked Mantis 6th in their "Top 10 Bug-Themes Comic Book Characters" list.
 In 2020, Scary Mommy included Mantis in their "Looking For A Role Model? These 195+ Marvel Female Characters Are Truly Heroic" list.
 In 2022, The A.V. Club ranked Mantis 86th in their "100 best Marvel characters" list.

Other versions

Heroes Reborn
In the Heroes Reborn reality, the alternate version of Mantis is the woman Kang the Conqueror loves, and Kang's motive to attack the 20th Century and the Avengers is to show that he is worthy of her love. Mantis recognizes her love for Kang after he is killed by Loki, who kills her shortly after.

House of M
In this reality, Mantis is a member of Shang-Chi's Dragons criminal organization, alongside, Swordsman, Zaran, and Machete. Mantis is arrested after the Dragons are ambushed by the Kingpin's assassins. She and Shang-Chi are two of the three survivors of the group.

Old Man Quill
Mantis continues to work with the Guardians for decades, long after Quill drops out. The main threat they encounter in this timeline is the Universal Church of Truth, which commonly destroys entire planets.

In other media

Television
 Mantis appears in the Guardians of the Galaxy animated series, voiced by Jennifer Hale. This version is a member of the Universal Believers. She first appears in season 1 episode titled "Don't Stop Believing". Believing Star-Lord to be the one to save the people of Spartax from their oppressive emperor J'son, she aids the guardians in infiltrating the royal palace. Well inside she tries to assassinate J'son only to be stopped by Star-Lord and arrested. Mantis return as a major antagonist in the second season. She and the true believers are trying to steal the cocoon of Adam Warlock in an effort to revive him and bring about a golden age. She and the believers succeed in reviving Warlock who is revealed to be in an infant state. She and the believers all kneel and as they do the guardians swoop in and steal kid Warlock away, foiling the believers plans. Later it is revealed that J'son himself was the leader of the Believers and that after her imprisonment, Mantis' mental powers along with that of all believers were removed and used to create "belif-batteries". These batteries were used by the cult to create various energy weapons. After failing with Warlock, Mantis tries to recruit Sam Alexander in order to free J'son from prison. Despite the interference of the Guardians her plan succeeds and she along with J'son and Sam escape. The trio search for Nova centurion helmets that J'son seeks to use to create a new empire. They find the helmets in the stomach of a whale-like creature and though the guardians once again interfere Mantis is able to hold of Gamora as Sam restrains the other guardians. J'son then orders Mantis and Sam to find suitable helmets for him to use. Mantis finds one for herself but upon wearing it is unable to control its power and she is killed as her body is turned to ash.
 Mantis appears in Lego Marvel Super Heroes - Guardians of the Galaxy: The Thanos Threat, voiced again by Jennifer Hale.

Marvel Cinematic Universe

Pom Klementieff portrays Mantis in Marvel Cinematic Universe. Mantis appears in Guardians of the Galaxy Vol. 2, Avengers: Infinity War, Avengers: Endgame, Thor: Love and Thunder, and The Guardians of the Galaxy Holiday Special. Mantis will return in Guardians of the Galaxy Vol. 3. Alternate reality versions of Mantis appear in the Disney+ animated series What If...?. One version appears in the seventh episode "What If... Thor Were an Only Child?", as an attendee of Thor's party on Earth. She is shown reacting in panic when the aliens overhear that Frigga is coming.

Video games
 Mantis is a playable character in Guardians of the Galaxy: The Universal Weapon.
 Mantis is a playable character in Lego Marvel's Avengers, voiced by Ali Hillis.
 Mantis is a playable character in Marvel Future Fight.
 Mantis is a playable character in Marvel: Avengers Alliance.
 Mantis was a recruitable character in Marvel Avengers Academy, voiced by Mel Gorsha.
 Mantis appears in Guardians of the Galaxy: The Telltale Series, voiced by Sumalee Montano. She first appears in episode 3, when Star-Lord and Gamora free her from her casket on Emnios. Afterwards, she tells the Guardians of the Galaxy the truth about the Eternity Forge.
 Mantis is a playable character in Lego Marvel Superheroes 2, voiced by Arina Li.
 Mantis appears in Marvel's Guardians of the Galaxy, voiced by Emmanuelle Lussier-Martinez.
 Mantis appears in the digital collectible card game Marvel Snap.

Theme park

 Mantis appears in the Guardians of the Galaxy – Mission: Breakout! attraction at Disney California Adventure. Her picture can be seen on a wanted poster in the attraction line, and she is later seen aiding the Guardians in their escape from the Collector's fortress. Mantis is portrayed by Pom Klementieff, reprising her role from Guardians of the Galaxy Vol. 2.

References

External links
 
 Mantis at Writeups.org

Avengers (comics) characters
Characters created by Don Heck
Characters created by Steve Englehart
Comics characters introduced in 1973
Female characters in film
Fictional characters with energy-manipulation abilities
Fictional characters with plant abilities
Fictional characters with precognition
Fictional empaths
Fictional female sex workers
Fictional German people
Fictional illeists
Fictional prostitutes
Fictional sex workers
Fictional Vietnamese people
Guardians of the Galaxy characters
Marvel Comics characters with accelerated healing
Marvel Comics female superheroes
Marvel Comics film characters
Marvel Comics martial artists
Marvel Comics mutates
Marvel Comics plant characters
Marvel Comics telepaths
Prostitution in comics